Alexander Prent (born 25 May 1983) is a Dutch footballer who plays as a winger for VV Jonathan in the Dutch Derde Klasse.

Career
He played for several minor clubs in his home town before being signed by NEC Nijmegen. Prent played for the youth-team until season 2004-05 when he moved up to the senior team. During the next season 2005–2006 he suffered a knee injury that only made him play 7 games for the club, NEC loaned him out to TOP Oss in the Eerste Divisie during season 2006–2007.

In the autumn of 2007 he spent a few days on trial with Halmstads BK and played a friendly against FC Nordsjælland, in which he scored a goal, and then on December 7, 2007, he signed for the club and joined them in January 2008. Near the end of the 2010 season, it was reported that Prent would not get his contract renewed and he left Halmstads BK at the end of the season.

On 15 February 2011 Prent returned to the Netherlands as he signed for SC Cambuur in Eerste Divisie, he had previously been on trial with German club Dynamo Dresden failing to gain a contract.

On 10 December 2011, Prent was signed to V-League side SHB Đà Nẵng.

References

External links
Profile hbk.se 

1983 births
Living people
Footballers from Utrecht (city)
Dutch footballers
Dutch expatriate footballers
Eredivisie players
Eerste Divisie players
Derde Divisie players
Allsvenskan players
Expatriate footballers in Sweden
NEC Nijmegen players
Halmstads BK players
TOP Oss players
SC Cambuur players
JVC Cuijk players
Association football midfielders